The Red Bridge is a late 19th-century painting by American artist Julian Alden Weir. Done in oil on canvas, Red Bridge has been cited as an excellent example of Weir's Japanese-inspired style of impression. The painting is in the collection of the Metropolitan Museum of Art.

Description 
The Red Bridge was painted by Weir as an impressionist work; the artist had previously been a detractor of impressionism. The bridge depicted in the painting was a then-new iron truss bridge built over the Shetucket River in Windham, Connecticut. Weir initially viewed the bridge with distaste - it had replaced an older covered bridge he was fond of - but eventually chose to painting a picture of it.

According to the Met, the painting is one of the few American impressionist painting to refer to industrialization.

References 

1895 paintings
Paintings in the collection of the Metropolitan Museum of Art